Peraga (minor planet designation: 554 Peraga) is a minor planet orbiting the Sun that was discovered by German astronomer Paul Götz on January 8, 1905, from Heidelberg.

13-cm radar observations of this asteroid from the Arecibo Observatory between 1980 and 1985 were used to produce a diameter estimate of 101 km.

References

External links 
 Lightcurve plot of 554 Peraga, Palmer Divide Observatory, B. D. Warner (2006)
 Asteroid Lightcurve Database (LCDB), query form (info )
 Dictionary of Minor Planet Names, Google books
 Asteroids and comets rotation curves, CdR – Observatoire de Genève, Raoul Behrend
 Discovery Circumstances: Numbered Minor Planets (1)-(5000) – Minor Planet Center
 
 

Background asteroids
Peraga
Peraga
FC-type asteroids (Tholen)
Ch-type asteroids (SMASS)
19050108